Monica Harish Sumra (born 14 October 1980) is an Indian former cricketer who played as a right-handed batter and occasional wicket-keeper. She appeared in three Test matches, 14 One Day Internationals and one Twenty20 International for India between 2004 and 2006. She played domestic cricket for Jharkhand, Railways and Mumbai.

References

External links
 
 

Living people
1980 births
Cricketers from Nagpur
Indian women cricketers
India women Test cricketers
India women One Day International cricketers
India women Twenty20 International cricketers
Jharkhand women cricketers
Railways women cricketers
Mumbai women cricketers
East Zone women cricketers
West Zone women cricketers